is a Japanese yaoi manga series written by Eiki Eiki and illustrated by Taishi Zaō. It began serialization in the July 2010 issue of Kadokawa Shoten's Asuka Ciel magazine. The manga is licensed in North America by SuBLime. A spin-off light novel series titled Back Stage!! began publication in May 2011. A 10-episode anime television series adaptation produced by J.C.Staff aired between July and September 2014.

Characters

Portrayed by: Mahiro Sugiyama (film)
Izumi is the main protagonist of the story. A college student at the age of eighteen, he aspires to be a manga author despite lacking the talent for it. His father is a director, his mother is a film actress, and his older brother Shōgo is the lead vocalist of a popular band. Ten years ago, he botched a bouquet catching scene in a commercial while dressed as a girl, and since then he refuses to be involved in the entertainment industry due to his "accident" caused by stage fright. Over the course of the series, he begins to develop strong feelings for Ryoma and falls in love with him. He is a huge fan of the fictional anime show Magical Girl Lala-Lulu. Izumi is often mistaken as a girl due to his tiny frame.

Portrayed by: Hiroki Nakada (film)
Ryoma is a popular young actor two years older than Izumi, who fell in love with him as a child, thinking him to be a girl, when they co-starred in a commercial together ten years prior. Even after he finds out Izumi is a guy when they reunite, he still maintains strong feelings for him. He fell in love with Izumi when he was ten and Izumi was eight during the commercial.

Portrayed by: Shinichi Wago (film)
Rei is the Sena family's manager. He was taken in by Izumi's father, Seiya Sena, when he was 18 years old and has lived with the family since then.

Shōgo is Izumi's doting older brother. Whenever Rei has problems regarding Izumi, Rei contacts his brother. He always dotes on his younger brother and gives Izumi Magical Girl Lala-Lulu merchandise whenever the situation calls for it. Shōgo has been in love with Rei since he was 16 and is the main reason why he joined the band Crusherz.

Media

Manga
Love Stage!! is written by Eiki Eiki and illustrated by Taishi Zaō. It began serialization in the July 2010 issue of Kadokawa Shoten's Asuka Ciel magazine. Seven tankōbon volumes was published from May 27, 2011 to November 1, 2016. The manga is licensed in North America by SuBLime. The manga is also published in Germany by Tokyopop.

Light novels
The first volume of a spin-off light novel series titled Back Stage!!, written by Eiki Eiki and Kazuki Amano, with illustrations by Taishi Zaō, was published by Kadokawa Shoten under their Kadokawa Ruby Bunko imprint on May 31, 2011. As of June 1, 2013, three volumes have been released.

Anime
A 10-episode anime adaptation was first announced by Kadokawa in November 2013 at Animate Girls Festival. Directed by Ken'ichi Kasai and produced by J.C.Staff, it aired between July 9 and September 10, 2014 on Tokyo MX. The screenplay is written by Michiko Yokote and the character design is by Yōko Itō. Crunchyroll licensed the series to be streamed in countries of North America, Europe, Latin America and Africa. It was released in five DVD and Blu-ray volumes by Kadokawa Shoten from September 26, 2014 to January 24, 2015. The opening theme is "LΦvest" by Screen Mode under the record label Lantis and the ending theme is "Click Your Heart!!" by Kazutomi Yamamoto.

Episode list

Film

The September 2019 issue of Ciel announced that a live-action film adaptation for Love Stage!! had been green-lit, with Eiki Eiki, the manga's original author, in charge of the screenplay. To promote the announcement, a short story was printed in the issue along with a re-print of the manga's first chapter. On October 2, 2019, the film's cast and 2020 release date was announced.

References

External links
Love Stage!! at Kadokawa Shoten 
Anime official website 

2010 manga
Anime series based on manga
Eiki Eiki
J.C.Staff
Josei manga
Manga creation in anime and manga
Television series about filmmaking
Kadokawa Shoten manga
Kadokawa Dwango franchises
Japanese LGBT-related animated television series
Mikiyo Tsuda
Romantic comedy anime and manga
Sentai Filmworks
SuBLime manga
Tokyopop titles
Yaoi anime and manga
2010s LGBT-related comedy television series
2010s LGBT literature
Japanese romantic comedy films
2020 films
2020 LGBT-related films
Japanese LGBT-related films
LGBT-related romantic comedy films